Alliance Ethnik was a 1990s French hip hop band. It was composed of five members from different origins, but all spoke French or were of French origin; Algeria, DR Congo, Italy, and France.

History
K-Mel, the front man of Alliance Ethnik, performed for the first time in his home town of Creil, France. He formed the group with friends Médard and Gutsy, which expanded to include the DJs Crazy B and Faster J soon after this debut. The members recorded a demo tape which was heard by IZB, a group of rap promoters, who put them in a Paris concert with the Marseille rap group IAM in 1992.

The group began recording in 1994, with an appearance on the compilation album Mondial Rap but its first album was Simple & Funky, released in 1995. It included the singles "Simple & Funky",  "Respect" and "Honesty & Jalousie".

Discography

Albums

The second album includes guest appearances by De La Soul, Common, Vinia Mojica, Youssou N'Dour and Biz Markie

Compilations
 Best of Alliance Ethnik (2002) Including guest appearances by De La Soul, Common, Cheb Mami, Vinia Mojica, and Biz Markie

Singles

References

External links
 Fan site

French hip hop groups
Musical groups from Hauts-de-France